Huntin' Fool Magazine is a monthly magazine dedicated to big game hunting in the Western United States. The magazine is part of Carter Hunter Services. Huntin’ Fool is a resource for non-resident hunters, as well as those interested in trophy hunting. The publication focuses on big game hunting in Arizona, California, Colorado, Idaho, Kansas, Montana, Nevada, New Mexico, Oregon, Utah, Washington and Wyoming.

Content
Huntin’ Fool features information big game hunters use to apply for hunting licenses and tags and to select hunting expeditions based on their particular style and goals. In addition to members' stories and outfitted hunt opportunities, the magazine offers hunting statistics, licensing deadlines, hunt dates, and other useful information.

The January through June issues of Huntin’ Fool are dedicated to a more thorough analysis of each western state’s big game hunting opportunities, with 2 to 3 states being addressed in each issue.

See also
Hunter-Trader-Trapper (1900-1938) American outdoors magazine

References

External links
Huntin' Fool Magazine's official website

1995 establishments in Utah
Monthly magazines published in the United States
Sports magazines published in the United States
Hunting and fishing magazines
Magazines established in 1995
Magazines published in Utah